Smyth station is a bus stop on Ottawa's Transitway served by OC Transpo buses. It is located in the south-eastern transitway section on Frobisher Lane near Smyth Road.

Most of its users come from the six apartment highrises in face of it and the business area on nearby Alta Vista Drive, because of the Rideau River behind the station and a train line on the other side of the apartments.

Service

The following routes serve Smyth:

Notes 
 Route  is available nearby on Smyth Road, just south of the station, Monday-Saturday.

Features 

 Elevator
 Taxi pick-up
 Ticket machine
 Emergency call boxes
 Payphone (Bell)
 OC Transpo Information Line

References

External links
OC Transpo station page
OC Transpo Area Map

1991 establishments in Ontario
Transitway (Ottawa) stations